The 2014–15 Danish Superliga season was the 25th season of the Danish Superliga, which decides the Danish football championship.

Since Denmark dropped from fifteenth to nineteenth place in the 2014 UEFA association coefficient rankings at the end of the 2013–14 season, only the champion of the league qualified for the UEFA Champions League; that club would commence its campaign in the second qualifying round. Furthermore, the second and third-place clubs would now enter the UEFA Europa League in the first qualifying round.

Teams
AGF and Viborg FF finished the 2013–14 season in 11th and 12th place, respectively, and were relegated to the 2014–15 1st Division.

The relegated teams were replaced by 2013–14 1st Division champions Silkeborg IF and the runners-up Hobro IK.

On 17 July 2014, the national stadium and home to FC København changed its official name to Telia Parken due to a sponsorship agreement with Telia.

Stadia and locations

Personnel and sponsoring
Note: Flags indicate national team as has been defined under FIFA eligibility rules. Players and Managers may hold more than one non-FIFA nationality.

Managerial changes

League table

Results

Matchday 1–11

Matchday 12–33

Season statistics

Top goalscorers
Updated including all games played on 7 June 2015.

Source: Goalscorers

Top assists
Updated including all games played on 19. April 2015.

Source: Assists

Awards

Monthly awards

Other awards

References

External links

Superliga (uefa.com)

Danish Superliga seasons
1
Denmark